Paul Cornell "Cory" Stearns (born October 16, 1985) is an American ballet dancer who is a principal dancer with American Ballet Theatre, one of the three leading classical ballet companies in the United States.  Stearns is also a high fashion model.

Early life and training 

Stearns began dancing at age of three with the encouragement of his mother (who studied the Graham technique when she was younger). He began ballet training age five at the Seiskaya Ballet in St. James, New York under the direction of Mme. Valia Seiskaya, formally of the National Opera of Greece. At thirteen, Stearns received a full scholarship to Pittsburgh Ballet Theatre's summer intensive. At age fifteen, he participated in the Youth America Grand Prix and was awarded a full scholarship to study at the Royal Ballet School in London. During Stearns' time at the Royal Ballet School he performed as pop artist Kylie Minogue's dance partner in her music video for Chocolate. Stearns graduated from The Royal Ballet School in 2004 and returned to New York.

Dance career

Stearns joined the Studio Company of the American Ballet Theatre (ABT) in 2004. In the 2005 he was promoted to an apprentice with ABT and to the corps de ballet in 2006. He was appointed a Soloist in January 2009 and a Principal Dancer in January 2011.

Stearns' first major role with ABT was Conrad in Le Corsaire in 2008, and roles since have included Solor in La Bayadère, Oberon in The Dream, Basilio and Espada in Don Quixote, titular role in Onegin, Romeo in Romeo and Juliet, Prince Siegfried and Von Rothbart in Swan Lake, James in La Sylphide and the Prince in Alexei Ratmansky's The Nutcracker.

In the 2013/14 season, Stearns returned to London for a guest role as the Prince in Nutcracker at The Royal Ballet.

Reviewing Cinderella, The New York Times states Stearns was "chivalrous, handsome and calmly glowing amid virtuosity."

Modeling career

Stearns began his modeling career by chance in 2009 when an agent spotted him at "New Andy's Deli". Since then he has modeled for Louis Vuitton, Ramsey, and Dolce & Gabbana and has been photographed by Bruce Weber, Steven Klein, and Annie Leibovitz who shot him alongside fellow dancers Benjamin Millepied and Stella Abrera for a Vogue Magazine spread.

Personal life

Stearns was raised in Mattituck, Long Island. He resides in New York City. Stearns' partner is Devon Teuscher, also a principal dancer at the American Ballet Theatre.

Dance repertoire

Solor in La Bayadère
Her Prince Charming in Cinderella
Conrad in Le Corsaire
Basilio and Espada in Don Quixote
Oberon in The Dream
Études
Colas in La Fille mal gardée
Kaschei in The Firebird
Albrecht in Giselle
Grand Pas Classique
Her Lover in Jardin aux Lilas
Edward Rochester in Jane Eyre
Armand Duval in Lady of the Camellias
Des Grieux in Manon
Beliaev in A Month in the CountryThe Nutcracker-Prince in Alexei Ratmansky's The NutcrackerOnegin in OneginOther DancesRomeo and Paris in Romeo and JulietPrince Désiré, the Celtic Prince and a Fairy Knight in The Sleeping BeautyPrince Désiré in Ratmansky's The Sleeping BeautyPrince Siegfried and von Rothbart in Swan LakeJames in La SylphideThe Poet in Les SylphidesOrion and Apollo in SylviaPrince Coffee in Whipped CreamMonotones IISymphony in CDrink to Me Only With Thine EyesCreated roles
Mithridates in Of Love and RageAFTERITEI Feel The Earth MoveHer NotesPiano Concerto #1 A Time There WasFrom Here On OutOne of ThreePrivate Light''

Source:

Awards
 2009 Erik Bruhn Prize for best male dance
 2004 the Dame Ruth Railton Award for excellence in dance (Royal Ballet School)
 2003 the Dame Ruth Railton Award for excellence in dance (Royal Ballet School)

References

External links
 Cory Stearns at American Ballet Theatre

1985 births
Living people
American male ballet dancers
American Ballet Theatre principal dancers
People educated at the Royal Ballet School